This is a list of geometric topology topics, by Wikipedia page. See also:

topology glossary
List of topology topics
List of general topology topics
List of algebraic topology topics
Publications in topology

Low-dimensional topology

Knot theory

Knot (mathematics)
Link (knot theory)
Wild knots
Examples of knots
Unknot
Trefoil knot
Figure-eight knot (mathematics)
Borromean rings
Types of knots
Torus knot
Prime knot
Alternating knot
Hyperbolic link
Knot invariants
Crossing number
Linking number
Skein relation
Knot polynomials
Alexander polynomial
Jones polynomial
Knot group
Writhe
Quandle
Seifert surface
Braids
Braid theory
Braid group
Kirby calculus

Surfaces

Genus (mathematics)
Examples
Positive Euler characteristic
2-disk
Sphere
Real projective plane
Zero Euler characteristic
Annulus
Möbius strip
Torus
Klein bottle
Negative Euler characteristic
The boundary of the pretzel is a genus three surface
Embedded/Immersed in Euclidean space
Cross-cap
Boy's surface
Roman surface
Steiner surface
Alexander horned sphere
Klein bottle
Mapping class group
Dehn twist
Nielsen–Thurston classification

Three-manifolds

Moise's Theorem (see also Hauptvermutung)
Poincaré conjecture
Thurston elliptization conjecture
Thurston's geometrization conjecture
Hyperbolic 3-manifolds
Spherical 3-manifolds
Euclidean 3-manifolds, Bieberbach Theorem, Flat manifolds, Crystallographic groups
Seifert fiber space
Heegaard splitting
Waldhausen conjecture
Compression body
Handlebody
Incompressible surface
Dehn's lemma
Loop theorem (aka the Disk theorem)
Sphere theorem
Haken manifold
JSJ decomposition
Branched surface
Lamination
Examples
3-sphere
Torus bundles
Surface bundles over the circle
Graph manifolds
Knot complements
Whitehead manifold
Invariants
Fundamental group
Heegaard genus
tri-genus
Analytic torsion

Manifolds in general 

Orientable manifold
Connected sum
Jordan-Schönflies theorem
Signature (topology)
Handle decomposition
Handlebody
h-cobordism theorem
s-cobordism theorem
Manifold decomposition
Hilbert-Smith conjecture
Mapping class group
Orbifolds
Examples
Exotic sphere
Homology sphere
Lens space
I-bundle

Mathematics-related lists
Outlines of mathematics and logic
Wikipedia outlines